W. DeCosta Young (April 11, 1919 – December 16, 2005) was a Canadian politician.  He had served in the Legislative Assembly of New Brunswick from 1967 to 1978 as member of the Progressive Conservative party.

References

1919 births
2005 deaths